Algot Lange (10 May 1884 -?) was a Swedish explorer and writer of the Amazon.

Biography
He was born on 10 May 1884 in Stockholm in Hovförsamlingen. His original name was Åke Mortimer Lange, but later he took his father's name. Parents were the opera singer Algot Lange and the pianist and author Ina Lange  Forstén.

He collected 2,000 pottery fragments from Pacoval Island in Lake Arary on Marajo Island, which were acquired by the American Museum of Natural History in 1915. 

Lange became a US citizen in 1915 and in 1941 was living in New York City.

Publications
In the Amazon jungle: adventures in remote parts of the upper Amazon river (1912) with J. Odell Hauser and Frederick Samuel Dellenbaugh
The lower Amazon: a narrative of explorations in the little known regions (1914):  Supplements In the Amazon jungle "with a most readable account of the new explorations and discoveries in this enormously rich but little known country.  Profusely illustrated."

References

External links
Algot Lange at the New York Public Library

 

1884 births
Year of death missing
Swedish explorers